Ranbir Pushp is an Indian film writer and novelist in the Indian film fraternity, Bollywood, nominated for the Filmfare Award for Best Screenplay and Filmfare Award for Best Story for the film Agni Sakshi. Frequent cast in his films include Ajay Devgan, Kajol, Saif Ali Khan, Sanjay Dutt and Nana Patekar. He is known for his films such as Jaan, Hameshaa, Agni Sakshi, and Yaarana. His film Agni Sakshi received seven nominations at Filmfare. He gained national fame due to success of Agni Sakshi, which later won a National Award. Pushp has worked for over 50 feature films and six television serials. 

His debut film as a director was Yaarana with Kashish Singh
 and Geeta Zaildar. The film revolved around the sport of football  and was rated 5 stars by Jag Bani. Pushp's next work will be a sequel to Agni Sakshi.

Early life

Pushp was born as Ranbir Kumar Kaushal to Mr. Kanshi Ram Kaushal in Patiala, India. He adopted the pen name Ranbir Pushp for social reasons. Pushp did his schooling from Arya school started writing short stories for All India Radio during school days, which he was very successful at. He completed his education from Govt. Mohindra College, Patiala. During college he worked as a writer and actor for All India Radio and Television.

Career

Pushp's first film as a writer was Film Hi Film in which actor Amitabh Bachchan performed as guest appearance. He later wrote a television serial, Paying Guest for Rajshri Productions and films like Dekha Pyar Tumhara, starring Kamal Haasan, and multi-star films such as Hawalaat starring Mithun Chakraborty, Rishi Kapoor and Shatrughan Sinha, and Hisaab Khoon Ka starring Mithun Chakraborty, Poonam Dhillon and Raj Babbar.

In the ‘90s Pushp worked on more than 21 films as a writer hits like  Sahebzaade starring Sanjay Dutt, Agni Sakshi (1996 film) with Nana Patekar, nominated for the Best Film for National Film Awards and Filmfare Award for Best Film, Hameshaa starring Saif Ali Khan, Return of Jewel Thief with Dev Anand and Jaan a silver jubilee hit starring Ajay Devgan being the top highlights.

He worked as a member of script approval committee Rajaya Film Vikas Parishad with Chairperson Jaya Bachchan for Ministry of Information and Public Relation, Govt. of Uttar Pradesh-(2003-2006). He went on to write films like Surya and Jimmy (2008 film), the debut film of Mahaakshay Chakraborty. Pushp entered the world of direction with the film Yaarana in 2015, the film was rated 5 stars by Jagbani. His next film as a writer will be the sequel to the hit film Agni Sakshi.

Awards

Filmfare Awards
 1997: Nominations: Filmfare Award for Best Screenplay: Agni Sakshi,   Filmfare Award for Best Story: Agni Sakshi

Filmography

References

External links
 

20th-century Indian film directors
Living people
Hindi-language film directors
Indian male screenwriters
Film directors from Mumbai
University of Mumbai alumni
Hindi film producers
21st-century Indian film directors
Film producers from Mumbai
1958 births